United States Army Network Enterprise Technology Command (NETCOM) is a US Military unit subordinate to United States Army Cyber Command. NETCOM's mission is to operate and defend the computer networks of the United States Army. The numerical command for NETCOM was 9th Army Signal Command, though this distinction was removed on 1 October 2011. Its heritage can be traced back to the creation of the 9th Service Company in 1918. The command headquarters is at Fort Huachuca, Arizona. Major General Christopher L. Eubank assumed command in April 2022.

Mission
NETCOM plans, engineers, installs, integrates, protects and operates Army Cyberspace, enabling Mission Command through all phases of Joint, Interagency, Intergovernmental and Multinational operations. Additionally, the commanding general is designated as the Deputy Commanding General for Network Operations, U.S. Army Cyber Command. With the headquarters at Fort Huachuca, Arizona, the NETCOM Team has nearly 16,000 Soldiers, Department of the Army Civilians and Contractors stationed and deployed in more than 22 countries around the world, providing direct and indirect support to Army, Joint and Coalition forces.

Commands and activities

Theater

 7th Signal Command (Theater) (Continental United States), Fort Gordon (Georgia)
 21st Signal Brigade, Fort Detrick (Maryland)
 93rd Signal Brigade (Eastern US), Fort Eustis (Virginia)
 106th Signal Brigade (Western US), Joint Base San Antonio (Texas)
 311th Signal Command (Theater) (Indo-Pacific), Fort Shafter (Hawaii)
 516th Signal Brigade, Fort Shafter (Hawaii) - supports US Army Pacific
 1st Signal Brigade, Camp Humphreys (South Korea) - supports Eighth Army
 2nd Signal Brigade, Wiesbaden (Germany) - supports US Army Europe
 160th Signal Brigade, Camp Arifjan (Kuwait) - supports US Army Central

Activities
US Army Signal Activity-Intelligence and Security Command (Fort Belvoir, Virginia)

History

U.S. Army Strategic Communications Command
On 1 March 1964, the Army activated U.S. Army Strategic Communications Command (referred to as STRATCOM) to exercise full command and control over worldwide strategic communications.

The first subordinate command USSTRATCOM formed was STRATCOM-Europe, established 1 July 1964, in Schwetzingen, West Germany.
STRATCOM-Europe absorbed 22nd and 106th Signal Groups and other communications responsibilities from USAREUR. By the end of 1965, all USAREUR communications duties, and even the position of USAREUR Deputy Chief of Staff for Communications–Electronics, had been transferred to STRATCOM-Europe. Changes in signals/military communications continued through the 1970s; 7th Signal Brigade was activated in 1970 from assets of the deactivated Seventh Army communications command. STRATCOM-Europe assumed operational control of the brigade in June 1972 and was redesignated as Army Communications Command-Europe (ACC-E) in October 1973. The 106th and 516th Signal Groups were also inactivated during this time and replaced by the 4th Signal Group.

STRATCOM established the 1st Signal Brigade to exercise command and control over all Army communications-electronics resources in Southeast Asia. Scattered among 200 sites in Vietnam and Thailand, this brigade became the largest combat signal unit ever formed. One of those units (formed in April 1969 until July that year), aided in the installation of modern communications equipment in Bang Phi, Thailand; improving the information networks for Southeast Asia.

STRATCOM leaders moved to modify the command's designation to better suit its changing mission by dropping "strategic" from its organizational title. On 1 Oct. 1973, the Army re-designated STRATCOM as the U.S. Army Communications Command (USACC).

U.S. Army Communications Command
During the early 1980s, Army automation focused on the development of hardware and software systems.  These systems were used for force development, personnel, supply, payroll, medical, maintenance, and troop support. Due to the scale of the work, the Army empowered USACC to lead development of strategic concepts for information systems management. USACC recommendations, combined with an Army Chief of Staff vision of consolidated information disciplines, gave genesis to the U.S. Army Information Systems Command (USAISC), the newest iteration of Fort Huachuca's strategic communications organization, on 1 May 1984.

U.S. Army Information Systems Command
Post Desert Storm Army downsizing and organizational review focused a critical eye on command structure. A general perception in the 1990s among major commands (MACOM) and theater commanders held that USAISC central management deprived them of needed command and control over regional and theater information systems, computer system acquisitions, and signal assets. The Department of the Army agreed and moved to dismantle USAISC, relegating the organization to major subordinate command status under U.S. Army Forces Command, and re-designating it as U.S. Army Signal Command (USASC) in September 1996.

U.S. Army Signal Command
Army MACOMs and theater commanders worked independently to resource their own Information System requirements. This decentralization and deregulation led to a proliferation of non-standardized command, control, communications, and computer (C4) systems and an unacceptable level of incompatibility among Army-wide communications equipment and support networks.

The department of the Army on 1 Oct. 2002, decided to again centralize service C4 and many aspects of information systems management and security under one Army command: the U.S. Army Network Enterprise Technology Command (NETCOM), reporting directly to the Army's Cyber Command (ARCYBER).

Mobile and Expeditionary Network
The Network cross-functional team (CFT) and the Program Executive Office Command, Control, Communications—Tactical (PEO C3T) hosted a forum on 1 August 2018 for vendors to learn what might function as a testable/deployable Army Network in the near future. A few of the hundreds of white papers from the vendors, adjudged to be 'very mature ideas', were passed to the Army's acquisition community, while many others were passed to CERDEC for continuation in the Army's effort to modernize the network for combat.  
In 2018, the brigades are transitioning from at-the-halt Tactical Network Transport to on-the-move systems.

List of commanders

 MG Carroll F. Pollett
 MG Susan S. Lawrence, 2010
 MG Jennifer L. Napper, 22 September 2010
 MG Alan R. Lynn, 9 August 2012
 BG Peter A. Gallagher, August 2013
 MG John B. Morrison, 2 April 2014
 MG John W. Baker, 10 August 2016
 MG Maria Barrett, 14 November 2018
 MG Christopher L. Eubank, 19 April 2022

See also
 9th Army Signal Command (United States)
 U.S. Army Cyber Command
 U. S. Army Signal Corps
 U.S. Cyber Command

References

External links
 NETCOM Home page
Headquarters and Headquarters Company 9th Signal Command Lineage
 

Signal Commands of the United States Army
United States Army Direct Reporting Units
Command and control in the United States Department of Defense
United States Army Service Component Commands
Command and control systems of the United States military